Goran Srbinovski (born 14 August 1956) is a Yugoslav volleyball player. He competed in the men's tournament at the 1980 Summer Olympics.

References

External links
 

1956 births
Living people
Yugoslav men's volleyball players
Olympic volleyball players of Yugoslavia
Volleyball players at the 1980 Summer Olympics
Place of birth missing (living people)